The 1984 Baltimore Orioles season was a season in American baseball. It involved the Orioles finishing 5th in the American League East with a record of 85 wins and 77 losses.

Offseason 
 February 7, 1984: Tom Underwood was signed as a free agent with the Baltimore Orioles.

Regular season 
 May 6, 1984: Cal Ripken Jr. hit for the cycle in a game against the Texas Rangers.
 Cal Ripken Jr. set an American League record for most assists by a shortstop with 583.
 During the season, Mike Boddicker became the last pitcher to win at least 20 games in one season for the Orioles in the 20th century.

Season standings

Record vs. opponents

Opening Day starters 
Rich Dauer
Rick Dempsey
Dan Ford
Wayne Gross
John Lowenstein
Scott McGregor
Eddie Murray
Cal Ripken Jr.
John Shelby
Ken Singleton

Notable transactions 
 August 14, 1984: Ron Jackson was signed as a free agent by the Orioles.

Roster

Player stats

Batting

Starters by position 
Note: Pos = Position; G = Games played; AB = At bats; H = Hits; Avg. = Batting average; HR = Home runs; RBI = Runs batted in

Other batters 
Note: G = Games played; AB = At bats; H = Hits; Avg. = Batting average; HR = Home runs; RBI = Runs batted in

Pitching

Starting pitchers 
Note: G = Games pitched; IP = Innings pitched; W = Wins; L = Losses; ERA = Earned run average; SO = Strikeouts

Other pitchers 
Note: G = Games pitched; IP = Innings pitched; W = Wins; L = Losses; ERA = Earned run average; SO = Strikeouts

Relief pitchers 
Note: G = Games pitched; W = Wins; L = Losses; SV = Saves; ERA = Earned run average; SO = Strikeouts

Farm system 

LEAGUE CHAMPIONS: Charlotte

Notes

References 

1984 Baltimore Orioles team page at Baseball Reference
1984 Baltimore Orioles season at baseball-almanac.com

Baltimore Orioles seasons
Baltimore Orioles season
Baltimore Orioles